Pål Ekeberg Schjerve (born 8 May 1985 in Hamar, Hedmark) is a Norwegian football defender who currently plays for Ham-Kam.

He was born in Hamar, and played youth football for Tangen IL in Stange and Ottestad IL before joining Hamarkameratene. He made his senior debut in the Norwegian football cup in 2002, and played his only two Norwegian Premier League games in 2006. He spent time on loan at Eidsvold TF in 2004 and 2007, the last time joining together with Kristian Skogsrud in a swap with Frode Bjørnevik. By 2007, though, he had already suffered a broken leg injury twice. Ahead of the 2008 season he joined Nybergsund IL, but ahead of the 2010 season he rejoined Hamarkameratene.

References

1985 births
Living people
Sportspeople from Hamar
Norwegian footballers
Hamarkameratene players
Nybergsund IL players

Association football defenders